Limited jurisdiction, or special jurisdiction, is the court's jurisdiction only on certain types of cases such as bankruptcy, and family matters.

Courts of limited jurisdiction, as opposed to general jurisdiction, derive power from an issuing authority, such as a constitution or a statute. Special jurisdiction courts must demonstrate that they are authorized to exert jurisdiction under their issuing authority.  In contrast, general jurisdiction courts need only to demonstrate that they may assert in personal jurisdiction over a party.

Differences

Sometimes the term "special courts" is used to refer to courts of limited
jurisdiction: "Special courts" has unfortunate connotations, however, because the
designation is often given by totalitarian governments to tribunals set up to persecute government opponents or otherwise help commit human rights abuses. That is a different kind of justice: not because it does not confer upon courts the power to hear only certain types of cases; but above all because a political trial denies the basic principles of the due process of law.

Examples
Courts of limited jurisdiction "exist in virtually all modern
nations. In the United States, for instance, the federal court system
includes several important courts of limited jurisdiction, including
the U.S. Tax Court, the U.S. Court of Federal Claims, the U.S. Court
of International Trade, and the U.S. Court of Military Appeals.
Courts of limited jurisdiction exist in Spain and in many Latin
American countries, such as Mexico, Chile, Venezuela and Brazil".

See also
 Specialized court
 General jurisdiction

References

Jurisdiction